Marcos Benjamín Lee (born 12 July 1977), better known as Marco,  is a South Korean model and actor, born and raised in Argentina.

Biography 
After only making minor cameo appearances in dramas, Marco is best known for appearing on popular reality show We Got Married alongside Son Dam Bi.

He later appeared in After School's music video "AH."

Marco appeared as a cast member of MBC Every1's 2010 family reality show Family Needed: Season 4 along with Park Jun-gyu, Kang Soo-ji, Actress Kim Jung-min and girl group Secret's Han Sunhwa, and was a regular cast member of the MBC's Sunday Sunday Night show Danbi. In 2011, Lee married Korean golfer, Ahn Shi-hyun and they were divorced in 2013.

Filmography 
 It's Okay, Daddy's Girl (SBS, 2010)
 Dream (SBS, 2009)
 Don't Cry My Love (MBC, 2009)
 Kokkiri (MBC, 2008)
 Air City (MBC, 2007)
 Only You (SBS, 2005)

References

South Korean male television actors
South Korean male film actors
South Korean male models
Argentine male television actors
Argentine male film actors
Argentine male models
Argentine people of Korean descent
1977 births
Living people